St. Paul's Church and Cemetery also known as Old St. Paul's Lutheran Church or St. Paul's Lutheran Church is a church in Newton, North Carolina.  It was listed on the National Register of Historic Places in 1971 as a Historic Place in Catawba County, North Carolina.

St. Paul's Church, Newton is a two-story log weatherboarded church built in 1818. It features a Federal style interior with carved sounding board and moldings and a separate, now repurposed, slave balcony. The building is one of the oldest existing churches in North Carolina west of the Catawba River. The graveyard headstones date to the late 18th century.  The St. Paul's Reformed Church at Startown formed from this congregation in 1904.

References

External links
 Old St. Paul's Lutheran Church website

Churches on the National Register of Historic Places in North Carolina
Cemeteries on the National Register of Historic Places in North Carolina
Churches completed in 1818
19th-century Lutheran churches in the United States
Federal architecture in North Carolina
Churches in Catawba County, North Carolina
National Register of Historic Places in Catawba County, North Carolina